Duronto Express is a category of long-distance non-stop source to destination trains run by the Indian Railways. Initially these trains did not have any ticketing stops between the origin and the destination, but since January 2016 it is possible to book tickets from those technical stops. "Duronto" means "Speedster" in Bengali. These trains' coaches have characteristic yellow-green livery which contains a bi-meaning signature which are a field full of flower and a river flowing over it, 2nd meaning is a boy is running on the fields which signifies the meaning of Duronto. Duronto Express services connect the several metros and major state capitals of India. As of now, there are currently 24 pairs that are working .

History
The Government of India's Ministry of Railways has been trying to introduce high-speed rail in India. In 2007, the ministry chose the 500-kilometre stretch between Delhi and Amritsar for a pre-feasibility study. On 19 January 2009, Railway Minister, Mamata Banerjee, said that the ministry was in the process of appointing global consultants for introducing the high-speed trains on certain routes. Besides the Delhi–Amritsar route, Pune–Mumbai–Ahmedabad, Hyderabad–Dornakal–Vijaywada-Chennai, Chennai–Bangalore–Coimbatore–Ernakulam–Thiruvananthapuram and Howrah–Haldia. But, this high-speed rail service for India is expected to be completed on a long run.

Meanwhile, non-stop Duronto Express trains were introduced in 2009–10 as a first step towards high-speed rail travel in India. The first Duronto ran between Sealdah and New Delhi.

List of Duronto Express trains

List of defunct Duronto Express trains

Gallery

Efficiency and speed
The Duronto Express is one of the fastest trains in India. Some of these trains run faster than Rajdhani Express trains which hold the record of the fastest long-distance trains in India. For example, the Sealdah–New Delhi Duronto Express takes 16 hours to cover the journey against 17 hours taken by Rajdhani Express. Similarly, the Chennai–Hazrat Nizamuddin Duronto Express takes 28 hours to cover the journey while the Chennai Rajdhani Express takes 28 hours 35 minutes to do so. The trains will adhere to the speed limit of 130 km/h. New Delhi–Sealdah Duronto Express has a top speed of 130 km/h. The Chennai, Sealdah, Yeshwantpur and Pune Duronto runs at a speed of 130 km/h. The Howrah/Allahabad/Bhubaneshwar New Delhi, Secunderabad Hazrat Nizamuddin, with Hybrid-LHB rakes is the only Duronto permitted to run at a speed of 120 km/h In March 2011, the cost of travel in the Duronto Express went up as the Minister of Railways announced a hike in railway fare. The decision to hike railway fares resulted in trouble across the Government and were rolled back, only to be raised again on 1 April. A feature exclusive to the Duronto is the LHB Sleeper coach. The sleeper class is the most common coach, and usually ten or more coaches can be attached. Dynamic pricing is applicable on all scheduled Duronto express journeys.

Incidents and accidents
 In January 2010, the passengers of the Duronto Express between Nagpur and Mumbai complained about passengers without confirmed tickets travelling inside the reserved coaches.
 In May 2010, at least 19 passengers on board the Ernakulam Duronto Express were admitted to the Government General Hospital after complaining of food poisoning.
 In June 2010, the Mumbai CST–Howrah Duronto Express  faced interruption as its engine and generator car were detached from the rest of the train's coaches due to technical problems. The problem was fixed within less than an hour.
 In June 2013, the 12264 Hazrat Nizamuddin–Pune Duronto derailed near Monkey Hill due to a landslide.
 In September 2015, 12220 Lokmanya Tilak Terminus–Secunderabad AC Duronto Express derailed at Martur station between Shahbad and Gulbarga on Solapur Division in Karnataka at around 02:15. Two passengers were killed and more than 30 injured when eight of its coaches were derailed.
 On 29 August 2017 12290 Nagpur Duronto Express heading towards Mumbai derailed between Vasind and Asangaon stations at 06.30 as heavy rains had caused mud slides onto the tracks which caused the derailment. No casualties were reported in an official statement by the Railway department.
 On 17 January 2019 unidentified persons entered into Jammu-Delhi Duronto near Badli, Delhi and looted the passengers.
 On 10 May 2019 engine failure caused late departure of the train from Mumbai central by an hour.
 On 11 August 2019 Yeshvantapur–Delhi Sarai Rohilla AC Duronto Express was cancelled due to "unavoidable circumstances".
 On 24 April 2019 12274 Howrah–New Delhi Duronto Express led by Howrah WAP-7 30370 ran over cattle while at MPS near Jamtara, Jharkhand. The locomotive failed and was backed by ABB made GZB WAP-5 30009, but due to throttle issues it too needed help. A banker Locomotive, GMO WAG-9 31932 was attached. No passenger casualties/injuries were reported. This was a rare incident where all three types of locomotives equipped with 3-phase technology were seen hauling one train.
 On 16 October 2022 More than 20 armed robbers reportedly climbed onto a Delhi-Kolkata Duronto Express train early on Sunday. Several passengers were allegedly looted at gunpoint by the robbers who climbed onto at least six-seven bogies of the train.

See also

References

External links

 List of Duronto Trains on India Rail website

Railway services introduced in 2009